Zuclopenthixol (brand names Cisordinol, Clopixol and others), also known as zuclopentixol, is a medication used to treat schizophrenia and other psychoses. It is classed, pharmacologically, as a typical antipsychotic. Chemically it is a thioxanthene. It is the cis-isomer of clopenthixol (Sordinol, Ciatyl). Clopenthixol was introduced in 1961, while zuclopenthixol was introduced in 1978.

Zuclopenthixol is a D1 and D2 antagonist, α1-adrenergic and 5-HT2 antagonist. While it is approved for use in Australia, Canada, Ireland, India, New Zealand, Singapore, South Africa and the UK it is not approved for use in the United States.

Medical uses

Available forms
Zuclopenthixol is available in three major preparations:

 As zuclopenthixol decanoate (Clopixol Depot, Cisordinol Depot), it is a long-acting intramuscular injection. Its main use is as a long-acting injection given every two or three weeks to people with schizophrenia who have a poor compliance with medication and suffer frequent relapses of illness. There is some evidence it may be more helpful in managing aggressive behaviour.
 As zuclopenthixol acetate (Clopixol-Acuphase, Cisordinol-Acutard), it is a shorter-acting intramuscular injection used in the acute sedation of psychotic inpatients. The effect peaks at 48–72 hours providing 2–3 days of sedation.
 As zuclopenthixol dihydrochloride (Clopixol, Cisordinol), it is a tablet used in the treatment of schizophrenia in those who are compliant with oral medication.

It is also used in the treatment of acute bipolar mania.

Dosing
As a long-acting injection, zuclopenthixol decanoate comes in a 200 mg and 500 mg ampoule. Doses can vary from 50 mg weekly to the maximum licensed dose of 600 mg weekly. In general, the lowest effective dose to prevent relapse is preferred. The interval may be shorter as a patient starts on the medication before extending to 3 weekly intervals subsequently. The dose should be reviewed and reduced if side effects occur, though in the short-term an anticholinergic medication benztropine may be helpful for tremor and stiffness, while diazepam may be helpful for akathisia. 100 mg of zuclopenthixol decanoate is roughly equivalent to 20 mg of flupentixol decanoate or 12.5 mg of fluphenazine decanoate.

In acutely psychotic and agitated inpatients, 50 – 200 mg of zuclopenthixol acetate may be given for a calming effect over the subsequent three days, with a maximum dose of 400 mg in total to be given. As it is a long-acting medication, care must be taken not to give an excessive dose.

In oral form zuclopenthixol is available in 10, 25 and 40 mg tablets, with a dose range of 20–60 mg daily.

Side effects
Chronic administration of zuclopenthixol (30 mg/kg/day for two years) in rats resulted in small, but significant, increases in the incidence of thyroid parafollicular carcinomas and, in females, of mammary adenocarcinomas and of pancreatic islet cell adenomas and carcinomas. An increase in the incidence of mammary adenocarcinomas is a common finding for D2 antagonists which increase prolactin secretion when administered to rats. An increase in the incidence of pancreatic islet cell tumours has been observed for some other D2 antagonists. The physiological differences between rats and humans with regard to prolactin make the clinical significance of these findings unclear. 

Withdrawal syndrome:  Abrupt cessation of therapy may cause acute withdrawal symptoms (eg, nausea, vomiting, or insomnia). Symptoms usually begin in 1 to 4 days of withdrawal and subside within 1 to 2 weeks.

Other permanent side effects are similar to many other typical antipsychotics, namely extrapyramidal symptoms as a result of dopamine blockade in subcortical areas of the brain. This may result in symptoms similar to those seen in Parkinson's disease and include a restlessness and inability to sit still known as akathisia, a slow tremor and stiffness of the limbs. Zuclopenthixol is thought to be more sedating than the related flupentixol, though possibly less likely to induce extrapyramidal symptoms than other typical depots. As with other dopamine antagonists, zuclopenthixol may sometimes elevate prolactin levels; this may occasionally result in amenorrhoea or galactorrhoea in severe cases. Neuroleptic malignant syndrome is a rare but potentially fatal side effect. Any unexpected deterioration in mental state with confusion and muscle stiffness should be seen by a physician.

Zuclopenthixol decanoate induces a transient dose-dependent sedation. However, if the patient is switched to maintenance treatment with zuclopenthixol decanoate from oral zuclopenthixol or from i.m. zuclopenthixol acetate the sedation will be no problem. Tolerance to the unspecific sedative effect develops rapidly.

Very common Adverse Effects (≥10% incidence) 
 Dry Mouth
 Somnolence
 Akathisia
 Hyperkinesia
 Hypokinesia

Common (1%≤incidence≤10%) 
 Tachycardia
 Heart palpitations
 Vertigo
 Accommodation disorder
 Abnormal vision 
 Salivary hypersecretion
 Constipation
 Vomiting
 Dyspepsia
 Diarrhoea
 Asthenia
 Fatigue
 Malaise
 Pain (at the injection site)
 Increased appetite
 Weight gain
 Myalgia
 Tremor
 Dystonia
 Hypertonia
 Dizziness
 Headache
 Paraesthesia
 Disturbance in attention
 Amnesia
 Abnormal gait
 Insomnia
 Depression
 Anxiety
 Abnormal dreams
 Agitation
 Decreased libido 
 Nasal congestion
 Dyspnoea
 Hyperhidrosis
 Pruritus

Uncommon (0.1%≤incidence≤1%)
 Hyperacusis
 Tinnitus
 Mydriasis
 Abdominal pain
 Nausea
 Flatulence
 Thirst
 Injection site reaction
 Hypothermia
 Pyrexia
 Liver function test abnormal
 Decreased appetite
 Weight loss
 Muscle rigidity
 Trismus
 Torticollis
 Tardive dyskinesia
 Hyperreflexia
 Dyskinesia
 Parkinsonism
 Syncope
 Ataxia
 Speech disorder
 Hypotonia
 Convulsion
 Migraine
 Apathy
 Nightmares
 Libido increased
 Confused state
 Ejaculation failure
 Erectile dysfunction
 Female orgasmic disorder
 Vulvovaginal
 Dryness
 Rash
 Photosensitivity
 Pigmentation disorder
 Seborrhoea
 Dermatitis
 Purpura
 Hypotension
 Hot flush

Rare (0.01%≤incidence≤0.1%)
 Thrombocytopenia
 Neutropenia
 Leukopenia
 Agranulocytosis
 QT prolongation
 Hyperprolactinaemia
 Hypersensitivity
 Anaphylactic reaction
 Hyperglycaemia
 Glucose tolerance impaired
 Hyperlipidaemia
 Gynaecomastia
 Galactorrhoea
 Amenorrhoea
 Priapism
 Withdrawal symptoms

Very rare (incidence<0.01%)
 Cholestatic hepatitis
 Jaundice
 Neuroleptic malignant syndrome
 Venous thromboembolism

Pharmacology

Pharmacodynamics

Zuclopenthixol antagonises both dopamine D1 and D2 receptors, α1-adrenoceptors and 5-HT2 receptors with a high affinity, but has no affinity for muscarinic acetylcholine receptors. It weakly antagonises the histamine (H1) receptor but has no α2-adrenoceptor blocking activity .

Evidence from in vitro work and clinical sources (i.e. therapeutic drug monitoring databases) suggests that both CYP2D6 and CYP3A4 play important roles in zuclopenthixol metabolism.

Pharmacokinetics

History
Zuclopenthixol was introduced by Lundbeck in 1978.

References

External links
 Product information for Zuclopenthixol (CLOPIXOL), provided by the Therapeutic Goods Administration — https://www.ebs.tga.gov.au/ebs/picmi/picmirepository.nsf/pdf?OpenAgent&id=CP-2010-PI-05705-3

Typical antipsychotics
Alcohols
Chloroarenes
CYP2D6 inhibitors
Piperazines
Thioxanthene antipsychotics
Enantiopure drugs